David Somers may refer to:

 David Somers (businessman) (born 1948), Chairman of Rangers Football Club
 David Somers (referee) (born 1966), Scottish football referee